RedGate Park is a wooded public park in suburban Rockville, Maryland, which is 131 acres of natural green space situated between Maryland Route 28, parts of Rock Creek Regional Park, and Avery Road. It is administered by the Rockville, Maryland government as a public park and nature preserve. The park began as a public golf course, called RedGate Golf Course, which was designed and built in 1974. It operated until 2018, when it was converted into a public park as part of a unanimous vote to keep the land undeveloped, after a $3.2 million estimation for necessary repairs compelled the management company, Billy Casper Golf, a golf course management company located in Reston, Virginia, to terminate its 10-year lease three years early, opening up the possibility for redevelopment or preservation. Rockville local government hosted information and input sessions to determine the most suitable use of the land.

The park still retains the asphalt paths suited to golf carts, and many of the fixtures and structures that are common to a golf course, but the course itself has largely been absorbed by natural reclamation. This follows a recent trend of declining popularity for the sport of golf, and an increased desire for green space.

In March 2020, the city of Rockville voted unanimously to retain the entirety of the 131-acre park as a public nature preservation area.

The park is now a habitat to 170 species of native Maryland birds and serves as an open space with adjacent forests for these birds, which is needed for their feeding habits.

The Friends of Redgate Park organization claims that the park is now home to 166 identified bird species. Other animals frequenting the park include deer and fox.

In August 2019, Cornell's Ornithology designated the site as a "Birding Hotspot", on their website, eBird.

A city-approved master plan was submitted that would transform the mostly-wild green space into a developed multi-use park, with such amenities including a new visitor center, a dog park, community gardens, an amphitheater, a new parking lot, new road connections, a playground, a picnic area, and other improvements. The plan has since been pared down and the park will retain its passive recreational use except for the community gardens.

RedGate Park is a grassland habitat, dotted with man-made water features and mature trees that were installed during its time as a golf course. The park is adjacent to the National Park Service's Rock Creek Trail system, though currently there is no pedestrian or bicycle path connection between the two.

References 

Parks in Montgomery County, Maryland